Baisha is a town of Qingshui County, Gansu, China. , it has 14 villages under its administration.

References

Township-level divisions of Gansu
Qingshui County